Alice Baldwin may refer to:

 Alice Baldwin (abbess) (died 1546), last Abbess of Burnham Abbey
 Alice Gertrude Baldwin, 19th century suffragist
 Alice Mary Baldwin (1879–1960), American historian, educator, and dean of the Woman's College at Duke University, 1923–1947